Margit Messelhäuser is a West German slalom canoeist who competed from the mid-1980s to the early 1990s.

She won three medals at the ICF Canoe Slalom World Championships with two golds (K-1: 1985; K-1 team: 1987) and a silver (K-1 team: 1985).

References

West German female canoeists
Living people
Year of birth missing (living people)
Medalists at the ICF Canoe Slalom World Championships